Utthara Unni is an Indian Bharatanatyam dancer from Kerala. She has directed some short films, documentaries and music videos. She also acted in two films. She heads a dance academy called Temple Steps in Kochi, Kerala.

Career

As a dancer
She has performed in Natyanjali festivals held at Chidambaram, Kumbakonam, Thirunallar, Nagapattinam, Mayavaram, Thiruvarur and Thanjavur. Some of her stages include Soorya Dance Festival – Parampara, Mylapore Fine Arts – Chennai, Sangeetha Nataka Akademi – Thrissur, Nishagandhi – Trivandrum, Eranakulam Shiva temple, Guruvayur, Mookambika temple, Vyloppilli Samskriti Bhavan – Trivandrum. Utthara has also made a name for herself by giving solo concerts in other countries such as Nepal, Thailand, UAE, Abu Dhabi, Sharjah, Bahrain and Kuwait.

She is also the director of the dance school "Temple Steps" situated in Cochin,
 She is a member of the UNESCO International Dance Council.

As a film maker and singer
Utthara's directorial debut was through a short film Randaam Varavu featuring her mother Urmila Unni. The film won her five awards for best direction. She later directed a supernatural short-film featuring Urmila Unni and Devan called Ninth Month. She was praised about her writing and film making skills in her next short film Paw Prints featuring Siddique. The short film is about relationship between a man and a dog. She has also created music videos and documentaries. Utthara Unni is also an acclaimed singer and has released a music album titled Pathirapontheril..

As an actor and model
She made her debut in the Tamil film Vavval Pasanga (2012) directed by Suresh. Her first Malayalam film was Edavappathy, directed by Lenin Rajendran. Utthara portrayed dual roles of Vasavadatta (a famous character from Kumaran Asan's poem Karuna) and a modern girl Yamini in the parallel story of the film. Her performance was critically acclaimed and won her the Kerala Film Critics Association Award for the best upcoming actor (debut).

As a tv show host
Utthara started her TV career in 2015 with a show called Mambazham in Kairali TV. Currently, she is hosting a reality show on Amrita TV called Autumn Leaf to find the best music band in Kerala.

Personal life

Utthara Unni is daughter of Malayalam actress Urmila Unni and is married to businessman Nithesh S Nair

Awards
Drishya award for best direction for the Short Film Randaam Varavu
Guru Gopikrishna National Award for Bharatanatyam in 2016

Filmography

As actress

As TV show host

References

External links
 

Living people
Indian film actresses
Actresses in Malayalam cinema
Actresses in Tamil cinema
Actresses from Kochi
21st-century Indian actresses
People from Thiruvalla
Bharatanatyam exponents
Female dancers
1992 births